The Ministry of Justice of Papua New Guinea acts the principal advisor to the government and is responsible for all civil litigation matters by and against the state. The Minister of Justice (who serves simultaneously as the Attorney General) gives opinions on any questions relating to the interpretation or application of the laws of Papua New Guinea including the Constitution, Organic Laws, Acts of Parliament and all other subordinate legislation. The ministry oversees the following institutions: 

 The Department of Justice and Attorney General
 The Judicial and Legal Services Commission
 The Magisterial Services
 The National Judicial Staff Services
 The Land Titles Commission
 The National Lands Commission
 Constitutional and Law Reform Commission
 National and Supreme Courts
 Public Prosecutor’s Office
 Public Solicitor’s Office
 Legal Training Institute
 The Parole Board
 The Advisory Committee on the Power of Mercy

List of ministers (Post-1975 upon achieving independence) 

 Ebia Olewale (1975-1977)
 Belba Biri (1977-1978)
 Nahau Rooney (1978-1979) [1st female]
 Paul Torato (1980-1981)
 John Yaka (1981-1982)
 Tony Bais (1982-1985)
 Tom Pais (1985)
 Warren Dutton (1986-1987)
 Albert Kipalan (1987-1988)
 Bernard Narakobi (1989-1992)
 Philemon Embel (1992-1994)
 Robert Timo Nagele (1994-1996)
 Arnold Marsipal (1996-1997
 Jacob Wama (1997-1999)
 Kilroy Genia (2000-2001)
 Puri Ruing (2001-2002)
 Mark Maipakai (2002-2007)
 Allan Marat (2007-2010)
 Ano Pala (2010)
 Arnold Amet (2011)
 Allan Marat (2011-2012)
 Kerenga Kua (2012-2017)
 Davis Steven (2017-present)

See also 
 Justice ministry
 Politics of Papua New Guinea

References 

Justice ministries
Government of Papua New Guinea